Mallet's Mortar was a British shell-firing mortar built for the Crimean War, but never used in combat.

The mortar was designed by Robert Mallet and was constructed in separate sections so that it could be transported.

Robert Mallet first made his design public in 1854. There was little response from the authorities until Mallet wrote to the then Prime Minister Lord Palmerston in March 1855. Palmerston was taken with the idea and instructed the Board of Ordnance to arrange for the construction of two mortars of Mallet's design.

Thames Ironworks and Shipbuilding Company won the contract at a price of £4,300 per mortar. The company's bankruptcy resulted in the work being divided among three firms which managed to deliver the mortars in May 1857.

Testing began on 19 October 1857 with further testing on 18 December 1857, 21 July 1858 and 28 of July 1858. Each test was brought to an end by damage to the mortar.  A total of 19 rounds were fired with a rate of about four shells an hour being achieved.

Both mortars are in the collection of the Royal Armouries, the UK's national museum of arms and armour.

The gun used for testing is on loan to the Royal Artillery and is located at Repository Road, opposite the army base in Woolwich, while the unfired gun is on display at the Royal Armouries Fort Nelson near Portsmouth.

See also
List of heavy mortars
List of the largest cannon by caliber

References 
Citations

Bibliography

External links

https://web.archive.org/web/20110805194124/http://www.royalarmouries.org/visit-us/fort-nelson/galleries
http://www.victorianforts.co.uk/fortlog/mallet.htm Victorian Forts Website Mallet's Great Mortar
https://archive.org/stream/ballouspictorial1516ball#page/n333/mode/1up  Ballou's Pictorial of November 20, 1858, had an extensive contemporary article on the mortar.

Mortars of the United Kingdom
914 mm artillery
Individual cannons